Coorg Institute of Dental Sciences (CIDS) is located a top a hill in Virajpet town. The institution was set up in September 1999.

It is affiliated to the Rajiv Gandhi University of Health Sciences, Bangalore and recognized by the Dental Council of India, the Government of Karnataka and the Union Ministry of Health and Family Welfare.

Departments

Non-clinical
 Department of Anatomy
 Department of Physiology & Bio-chemistry
 Department of Dental Materials
 Department of Gen. & Dental Pharmacology
 Department of General Pathology & Microbiology
 Department of General Medicine
 Department of General Surgery

Clinical
 Department of Prosthodontics
 Department of Conservative Dentistry & Endodontics
 Department of Oral & Maxillofacial Surgery
 Department of Periodontics
 Department of Orthodontics
 Department of Pedodontics
 Department of Oral Medicine & Radiology
 Department of Community Dentistry
 Department of Oral Pathology & Microbiology

External links
Coorg Institute of Dental Sciences - Official website

Dental colleges in Karnataka
Colleges affiliated to Rajiv Gandhi University of Health Sciences
Universities and colleges in Kodagu district
Educational institutions established in 1999
1999 establishments in Karnataka